Jacquot Harinirina (born Antananarivo, 24 February 1981), known as Coco, is a Malagasy rugby union player. He plays as a wing, a fullback and a fly-half.

Harinirina plays for Tam Nosibe since 2004/05. He won the Cup of the President in 2013.

He is a regular player for Madagascar, having been the captain of the "Makis" and one of their best try scorers. He was in the team that won surprisingly 2012 Africa Cup defeating Namibia by 57-54 in extra-time.

References

External links
Jacquot Harinirina / TAM se donne les moyens pour être un grand club, L'Express de Madagascar, 13 February 2013 (French)

1981 births
Living people
Malagasy rugby union players
Rugby union wings
Rugby union fullbacks
Rugby union fly-halves